Maxime Hodencq (born 17 March 1987) is a Belgian racing driver from Anderlecht.

Hodencq moved directly from Karting to Belgian Formula Renault and a part-time Euro Formula 3000 ride in 2003 at 16 years old. In 2004 he competed full-time in Euro F3000 and finished 11th in points. He competed in two Formel 3 Cup races in 2005.

External links

1987 births
Living people
Belgian racing drivers
German Formula Three Championship drivers
Auto GP drivers
People from Anderlecht
Racing drivers from Brussels

Piquet GP drivers
21st-century Belgian people